Doğanlar is a Circassian village in the Laçin District of Çorum Province in Turkey. Its population is 47 (2022).

References

Villages in Laçin District